Nazim Uddin Ahmed is a Bangladesh Nationalist Party politician and the former Member of Parliament of Lakshmipur-1. He is president of the party's Ramganj branch.

Early life
Ahmed was born in 1968, into a Bengali Muslim family in Ramganj, Noakhali District, East Pakistan (now in Lakshmipur District, Bangladesh).

Career
Ahmed was elected to parliament from Lakshmipur-1 as a Bangladesh Nationalist Party candidate in 2008.

References

Bangladesh Nationalist Party politicians
Living people
9th Jatiya Sangsad members
1968 births
People from Ramganj Upazila
21st-century Bengalis